Stamford is an unincorporated community in Jackson County, in the U.S. state of South Dakota.

History
Stamford was laid out in 1906, and named after Stamford, Connecticut. A post office called Stamford was established in 1907, and remained in operation until 1966.

References

Unincorporated communities in Jackson County, South Dakota
Unincorporated communities in South Dakota